In speculative fiction, a force field, sometimes known as an energy shield, force shield, energy bubble or deflector shield, is a barrier made of things like energy, negative energy, dark energy, electromagnetic fields, gravitational fields, electric fields, quantum fields, plasma, particles, radiation, solid light, or pure force. It protects a person, area, or object from attacks or intrusions or even deflects energy attacks back at the attacker. This fictional technology is created as a field of energy without mass that acts as a wall, so that objects affected by the particular force relating to the field are unable to pass through the field and reach the other side, are deflected or destroyed. Actual research in the 21st century has looked into the potential to deflect radiation or cosmic rays, but also more extensive shielding.

This concept has become a staple of many science-fiction works, so much so that authors frequently do not even bother to explain or justify them to their readers, treating them almost as established fact and attributing whatever capabilities the plot requires. The ability to create force fields has become a frequent superpower in superhero media.

History
The concept of a force field goes back at least as far as early 20th century. The Encyclopedia of Science Fiction suggests that the first use of the term in science fiction appears to happen in 1931, in Spacehounds of IPC by E.E. 'Doc' Smith.
 
An early precursor of what is now called "force field" may be found in William Hope Hodgson's The Night Land (1912), where the Last Redoubt, the fortress of the remnants of a far-future humanity, is kept safe by "The Air Clog" generated by the burning "Earth-Current".

In Isaac Asimov's Foundation universe, personal shields have been developed by scientists specializing in the miniaturization of planet-based shields. As they are primarily used by Foundation Traders, most other inhabitants of the Galactic Empire do not know about this technology.  In an unrelated short story Breeds There a Man...? by Asimov, scientists are working on a force field ("energy so channelled as to create a wall of matter-less inertia"), capable of protecting the population in case of a nuclear war. The force field demonstrated in the end is a solid hemisphere, apparently completely opaque and reflective from both sides. Asimov explores the force field concept again in the short story Not Final!.

The concept of force fields as a defensive measure from enemy attack or as a form of attack can be regularly found in modern video games as well as in film, such as in The War of the Worlds (1953, George Pál) and Independence Day.

The ability to create a force field has been a common superpower in comic books and associated media. While only a few characters have the explicit ability to create force fields (for example, the Invisible Woman of the Fantastic Four and Violet Parr from The Incredibles), it has been emulated via other powers, such as Green Lantern's energy constructs, Jean Grey's telekinesis, and Magneto's manipulation of electromagnetic fields. Apart from this, its importance is also highlighted in Dr. Michio Kaku's books (such as Physics of the Impossible).

Fiction
Science fiction and fantasy avenues suggest a number of potential uses of force fields:

 A barrier allowing workers to function in areas exposed to the vacuum of space. The atmosphere inside would be habitable by humans, while at the same time allowing permissible objects to pass through the barrier
 A walkable surface between two points without the necessity of building a bridge.
 An emergency quarantine area to service those afflicted by harmful biological or chemical agents
 A fire extinguisher where oxygen is exhausted by the use of a space confined by a force field thereby starving the fire
 As a shield to protect against damage from natural forces or an enemy attack 
 As a deflector to allow fast spaceships to traverse space without colliding with small particles or objects.
 A temporary habitable space in an area otherwise unsuitable for sustaining life
 As a security apparatus used to confine or contain a captive

The capabilities and functionality of force fields vary; in some works of fiction (such as in the Star Trek universe), energy shields can nullify or mitigate the effects of both energy and particle (e.g., phasers) and conventional weapons, as well as supernatural forces. In many fictional scenarios, the shields function primarily as a defensive measure against weapons fired from other spacecraft. Force fields in these stories also generally prevent transporting. There are generally two kinds of force fields postulated: one in which energy is projected as a flat plane from emitters around the edges of a spacecraft and another where energy surrounds a ship like a bubble.

The ability to create force fields has become a frequent superpower in superhero media. While sometimes an explicit power on their own, force fields have also been attributed to other fictional abilities. Marvel Comics' Jean Grey is able to use her telekinesis to create a barrier of telekinetic energy that acts as a force field by repelling objects. Similarly, Magneto is able to use his magnetism to manipulate magnetic fields into acting as shields.
The most common superpower link seen with force fields is the power of invisibility. This is seen with Marvel Comics' Invisible Woman and Disney Pixar's Violet Parr.

Force fields often vary in what they are made of, though are commonly made of energy. The 2017 series The Gifted featured character Lauren Strucker who had the ability to create shields by pushing molecules together. This resulted in her being able to construct force fields out of air and water particles rather than energy.

Research
In 2005, the NASA Institute for Advanced Concepts devised a way to protect from radiation by applying an electric field to spheres made of a thin, nonconductive material coated with a layer of gold with either positive or negative charges, which could be arranged to bend charged particles to protect from radiation.

In 2006, a University of Washington group in Seattle had been experimenting with using a bubble of charged plasma, contained by a fine mesh of superconducting wire, to surround a spacecraft. This would protect the spacecraft from interstellar radiation and some particles without needing physical shielding.

Likewise, the Rutherford Appleton Laboratory is attempting to design an actual test satellite, which would orbit Earth with a charged plasma field around it.

In 2008, Cosmos Magazine reported on research into creating an artificial replica of Earth's magnetic field around a spacecraft to protect astronauts from dangerous cosmic rays. British and Portuguese scientists used a mathematical simulation to prove that it would be possible to create a "mini-magnetosphere" bubble several hundred meters wide, possibly generated by a small uncrewed vessel that could accompany a future crewed mission to Mars.

In 2014, a group of students from the University of Leicester released a study describing functioning of spaceship plasma deflector shields.

In 2015, Boeing was granted a patent on a force field system designed to protect against shock waves generated by explosions. It is not intended to protect against projectiles, radiation, or energy weapons such as lasers. The field purportedly works by  using a combination of lasers, electricity and microwaves to rapidly heat up the air creating a field of (ionised) superheated air-plasma which disrupts, or at least attenuates, the shock wave. As of March 2016, no working models are known to have been demonstrated.

In 2016, Rice University scientists discovered that the Tesla coils can generate force fields able to manipulate matter (process called teslaphoresis).

See also
Force field (physics)
Stasis field
Li's field
Magic circle
Plasma window
Psychokinesis
Tractor beam

Notes

Further reading
 

Physics in fiction
Fictional superhuman features or abilities
Science fiction themes
Fictional armour
Fictional energy weapons
Fictional technology
Shields
Space technology